Elizabeth Gould may refer to:
Elizabeth Gould (psychologist), American neuroscientist and professor of psychology at Princeton University
Elizabeth Gould (illustrator) (1804–1841), wife of John Gould and illustrator of The Birds of Australia.
Elizabeth Gould (author), coauthor with her husband Paul Fitzgerald (journalist) of books on the war in Afghanistan and situation in Pakistan as well as a columnist

See also
Elizabeth Gould Davis (1910–1974), U.S. librarian and feminist